Glencraig is a very small former mining village in Scotland, situated in the Benarty area of Fife, between Crosshill and Lochgelly. The village's population has decreased significantly since the decline of the coal-mining industry during the 1970s and 1980s.

There are two memorial notice boards in the vicinity of the village. One is dedicated to the colliery and the other to the village.

Notable people 
 Jock Aird - association footballer
 Peter Aird - association footballer
 Jim Comerford - trade union leader, miner, writer

References 

Villages in Fife
Mining communities in Fife